The Tunisian duro, also known as the dourou, a contraction of the French , is the common name of the small silver coin that is part of the Tunisian currency. The value of the coin is five millimes or 0.005 of a Tunisian dinar, and is the smallest denomination currently being minted (smaller 1 and 2 millime coins are no longer issued).

References

Economy of Tunisia